Digimon Adventure 02 is a 50-episode sequel of the 1999 anime series Digimon Adventure. It was created by Toei Animation and aired in Japan on Fuji TV between April 2, 2000, and March 25, 2001. The series was directed by Hiroyuki Kakudō and produced by Keisuke Okuda. Music for Digimon Adventure 02 was composed by Takanori Arisawa, and characters were designed by Katsuyoshi Nakatsuru. The story, set in an alternate timeline of the real world, opens four years after the events of Digimon Adventure with the next generation of DigiDestined children. In their quest to maintain peace in the Digital World, the kids battle both new and returning foes. In a 2001 survey published by Japanese anime and entertainment magazine Animage of its readers, Digimon Adventure 02 placed 17th on the list of anime that should be most remembered in the 21st century. It tied with the 1988 film My Neighbor Totoro. 

The series has aired in many countries in Asia, Europe, and the Americas in a combination of dubbed and subtitled versions. For example, Mexican public and cable television channels aired both versions of the anime. In the United States, the English dub of Digimon Adventure 02 began airing on Fox Kids on August 19th, 2000. Following the discontinuation of the programming block, it aired on ABC Family, Toon Disney, and Disney XD. During its airing on Fox Kids, the series helped push the network into first place during the February 2001 Nielsen ratings sweeps among viewers aged 6–11. The episodes of Digimon Adventure 02 have also been made available digitally through various media outlets. The first 15 episodes were made available for download on IGN's Direct2Drive service in July 2008. The subtitled version of the series has been hosted on the streaming media website Crunchyroll since October 27, 2008. In a digital partnership with Toei, Funimation Entertainment also began streaming the subtitled Digimon Adventure 02 on its online video portal on April 3, 2009. Volume DVDs have been released by Toei in Japan, and boxed sets have been released by Happinet in Japan and by Alliance Entertainment in North America.

The English opening reuses the theme song from Digimon Adventure by Paul Gordon.

The second season of Digimon: Digital Monsters (aka Digimon Adventure 02 in the original, unedited Japanese version) was licensed by Saban Entertainment in North America. The show initially aired on Fox Kids and Fox Family Channel, before distribution rights were held by Disney/BVS, later airing on Toon Disney and ABC Family.



Episode list

Volume DVDs

Japanese release 
Toei Video, the distribution arm of Toei Animation, released a total of 12 DVD compilations of Digimon Adventure 02 in Japan between January 21 and December 7, 2001. The series was also released as a 9-disc boxed set on December 22, 2006, by Happinet Pictures.

North American release 
New Video Group released the season on March 26, 2013.
 Digimon: Digital Monsters, Volume 4 (Episodes 1–21)
 Digimon: Digital Monsters, Volume 5 (Episodes 22–37)
 Digimon: Digital Monsters, Volume 6 (Episodes 38–50)

Australian release 
Two collections of the season (each containing 25 episodes) were released by Madman Entertainment. The first collection was released on 5 December 2012 with the second collection been released in 2013.

See also 

 Digimon
 List of Digimon Adventure episodes

Notes

References

External links 
 Digimon Adventure 02 official website 
 

Digimon Adventure 02
2000 Japanese television seasons
2001 Japanese television seasons
Adventure 02